Ceroptera is a genus of flies belonging to the family of the Lesser Dung flies.

Species
C. aharonii Duda, 1938
C. algira (Villeneuve, 1916)
C. alluaudi (Villeneuve, 1917)
C. brincki Hackman, 1965
C. catharsii Richards, 1953
C. crispa (Duda, 1925)
C. ealensis Vanschuytbroeck, 1951
C. equitans (Collin, 1910)
C. femorata Hackman, 1965
C. flava Vanschuytbroeck, 1959
C. ghanensis Papp, 1977
C. ghesquierei Vanschuytbroeck, 1951
C. intermedia Hackman, 1965
C. lacteipennis (Villeneuve, 1916)
C. longicauda Marshall in Marshall & Montagnes, 1988
C. longiseta (Villeneuve, 1916)
C. nasuta (Villeneuve, 1916)
C. ndelelensis Vanschuytbroeck, 1959
C. pelengensis Vanschuytbroeck, 1959
C. rubricornis (Duda, 1918)
C. rudebecki Hackman, 1965
C. rufitarsis (Meigen, 1830)
C. setigera Vanschuytbroeck, 1945
C. sivinskii Marshall, 1983
C. ungulata Hackman, 1965

References

Sphaeroceridae
Diptera of North America
Diptera of Africa
Diptera of Asia
Muscomorph flies of Europe
Sphaeroceroidea genera
Taxa named by Pierre-Justin-Marie Macquart